Edward Leslie Frauenfelder (26 February 1888 – 26 July 1955) was an Australian rules footballer who played with Richmond in the Victorian Football League (VFL).

Family
The son of August Henry Frauenfelder (1855-1916), and Emma Maria Frauenfelder (1864-1895), née Burton, Edward Leslie Frauenfelder was born at Murtoa, Victoria on 26 February 1888.

Football
Recruited from Albury, Frauenfelder played his first senior match for Richmond, against South Melbourne, at the Lake Oval, on 30 April 1910. He was one of the seven players who made their debut in that match, the first of the 1910 season: the other six were: Ernest Carter, Alick Davison, Frank Ellis, Mick Maguire, Bobby Scott, and Vic Thorp.

Death
He died on 26 July 1955.

Notes

References
 Football Notes: South in Spendid Fettle, The Australasian, (Saturday, 7 May 1910), p.21.
 Hogan P: The Tigers Of Old, Richmond FC, (Melbourne), 1996. 
 Holmesby, Russell & Main, Jim (2014). The Encyclopedia of AFL Footballers: every AFL/VFL player since 1897 (10th ed.). Seaford, Victoria: BAS Publishing. .

External links 

1888 births
1955 deaths
Australian rules footballers from New South Wales
Richmond Football Club players
Albury Football Club players